Arpad or Árpád may refer to:

People

 Árpád (given name), a Hungarian men's name
 Árpád (c. 845–907), first ruler of Hungary

Places

 Arpad, Syria, an ancient city in present-day Syria near Tell Rifaat
 Árpád, the Hungarian name for Arpăşel village, Batăr Commune, Bihor County, Romania

Other
 Árpád Bridge, a bridge in Budapest, Hungary, named after the above person
 Árpád dynasty, the ruling dynasty in Hungary
 Arpad, the Gypsy, a Hungarian-French-German television film series
 SMS Árpád, the name of an Austro-Hungarian battleship